A cutaway, in the industrial sense, refers to the display of a manufactured product, (an engine, a pump, a regulator, etc. . .) where a portion of the exterior housing has been removed to reveal the internal components, (pistons, bearings, seals, etc. . .) and their relationship to the functionality of the product.

Cutaways are typically used in product training, trade show environments, museum displays and for many additional applications. Cutaways are produced using a variety of methods by the manufacturer, by a cutaway service company, as mentioned above, or by an experienced machine shop.

While 3D modeling and CAD (Computer Aided Drafting) programs continue to improve and bring more features and benefits, the cutaway will continue to show the product as it appears in the real world, using actual parts and components to show relationships and functionality.

See also 
 Cutaway drawing

References

Industrial design